Ad-Din (  '(of) the Religion/Faith/Creed') is a suffix component of some Arabic names, meaning 'the religion/faith/creed', e.g. Saif al-Din. Varieties are also used in non-Arabic names throughout the Muslim world, It is used as a name-suffix by some royal Muslim families, including the imperial Seljuks, Walashmas, Mughals and the Alavid Hyderabadi Nawabs.

Due to the phonological rules involving the "sun letter", the Arabic letter  is an assimilated letter of the Arabic definite article . The first noun of the compound must have the ending -u, which, according to the assimilation rules in Arabic (names in general are in the nominative case), assimilates the following a-, thus manifesting into  in Classical and Modern Standard Arabic.

However, all modern Arabic vernaculars lack the noun endings. Thus, the vowel of the definite article in them is pronounced in full as either a or e (the latter mostly in Maghreb and Egypt). At the same time, the Arabic short vowel u is rendered as short o in Persian, thus .

So, in practice, romanizations of Arabic names containing this element may vary greatly, including:
 ,  (particularly in English-speaking South and East Asia),  (particularly in English-speaking South and East Asia)
  (particularly in French-speaking areas)
  (particularly in Turkish names)
  (particularly in Persian names)

Examples of names including this element are:

 Aladdin
 Alimuddin
 Amin ud-Din
 Anwaruddin
 Azharuddin
 Azim ud-Din
 Badr al-Din
 Baha' al-Din
 Burhan al-Din
 Fakhr al-Din
 Fariduddin
 Ghiyath al-Din
 Hamid al-Din
 Haqq ad-Din
 Hisham ud-Din
 Husam ad-Din
 Ikhtiyar al-Din
 Imad al-Din
 Ismat ad-Din
 Izz al-Din
 Jalal ad-Din
 Jamal ad-Din
 Kamal al-Din
 Khair ad-Din
 Majd ad-Din
 Mansur ad-Din
 Mohy al-Din
 Moinuddin
 Muhib ud-Din
 Mu'iz ad-Din
 Muslih ud-Din
 Najm al-Din
 Nasir al-Din
 Nawazuddin
 Nazimuddin
 Nizam al-Din
 Nur al-Din
 Qamar ud-Din
 Qutb ad-Din
 Rashid al-Din
 Riazuddin
 Rukn al-Din

 Sabah al-din
 Sabr ad-Din 
 Sa'd al-Din
 Sadr al-Din
 Safi al-Din
 Saif al-Din
 Ṣalāḥ ad-Dīn
 Shams al-Din
 Sharaf al-Din
 Shihab al-Din
 Shujauddin
 Sirajuddin
 Tanzim Harrar al-Din
 Taqi al-Din
 Zahir al-Din
 Zayn ad-Din (or Zinedine)
 Ziauddin

Use of Uddin as surname
In modern times in English-speaking environments, the name Uddin has sometimes been used as if it was a separate surname. An example is:
 Pola Uddin, Baroness Uddin (born 1959), British politician
 Aladdin serial in India available on Sony

See also
 al-Dawla
 Adin
 Esamuddin

Surnames of Arabic origin